Dilawar Hussain (born 1 April 1979) is a Pakistani field hockey player. He competed in the men's tournament at the 2004 Summer Olympics.

References

External links
 

1979 births
Living people
Pakistani male field hockey players
Olympic field hockey players of Pakistan
Field hockey players at the 2004 Summer Olympics
Place of birth missing (living people)
Commonwealth Games medallists in field hockey
Commonwealth Games silver medallists for Pakistan
Field hockey players at the 2006 Commonwealth Games
2002 Men's Hockey World Cup players
2006 Men's Hockey World Cup players
Medallists at the 2006 Commonwealth Games